Mount Typo is a mountain in Victoria, Australia.

See also

List of mountains in Victoria

References 

Mountains of Victoria (Australia)
Mountains of Hume (region)